The PWG World Championship is a professional wrestling world championship owned and copyrighted by Pro Wrestling Guerrilla (PWG). The championship was created and debuted on August 30, 2003, at PWG's Bad Ass Mother 3000 – Stage 2 event. Originally called the PWG Championship, the title was renamed to the PWG World Championship in February 2006 after the title was defended outside the United States for the first and second time—that month, then-champion Joey Ryan defeated Emil Sitoci in Essen, Germany at European Vacation – Germany and Jonny Storm in Orpington, England at European Vacation – England.

The championship is generally contested in professional wrestling matches, in which participants execute scripted finishes rather than contend in direct competition. All reigns are won at live events, which are released on DVD. The inaugural champion was Frankie Kazarian, whom PWG recognized to have become the champion after defeating Ryan in the finals of a 16-man tournament on August 30, 2003, at PWG's Bad Ass Mother 3000 – Stage 2 event. Bandido's only reign at 863 days is the longest in the title's history. PWG publishes a list of successful championship defenses for each champion on their official website (though this section of the website has not been updated in a few years).

Daniel Garcia is the current champion in his first reign, after defeating Bandido on May 1, 2022, to win the title. Overall, there have been 32 reigns among 25 different wrestlers and three vacancies. Low Ki, Bryan Danielson, and Davey Richards, all of whom vacated the championship, are the only people to have not been defeated for the championship.

Title history

Names

Reigns

Combined reigns 

References 
 General
 
 

 Specific

External links 
  PWG World Title History at Cagematch.net

Pro Wrestling Guerrilla championships
PWG World Championship